The Kilusang Diwa ng Taguig is a local regional political party in Taguig, Philippines. The party is headed by former Taguig Mayor Sigfrido "Freddie" Tiñga and his father, former Supreme Court Associate Justice and incumbent Development Bank of the Philippines chairman Dante Tiñga. It is formerly the ruling political group in Taguig until 2013.

Recently, it was the local affiliate of the Liberal Party from 2009. It is also the local affiliate of the National Unity Party since 2011. Prior to that, it had linkages with Lakas-Kampi-CMD, Reporma-LM, the PMM, and the Nationalist People's Coalition.

Following the 2010 elections, it held two seats in the House of Representatives and it caucused with the Liberal Party.

Liberal parties in the Philippines
Political parties in Metro Manila
Politics of Taguig